Sauter Pianofortemanufaktur GmbH & Co KG is a German piano manufacturer in Spaichingen, Baden-Württemberg.

The company was founded in 1819 by Johann Grimm, stepfather of Carl Sauter I.

The annual production of grand and upright pianos are of about 500 units and is one of the few remaining companies using 100% German parts.

Current Grand Piano Models

Current Upright Piano Models

References

External links 

 Official homepage

Piano manufacturing companies of Germany
Companies based in Baden-Württemberg